Dr. Laurence "Larry" Erhardt is a fictional character and one of the two original villains on the cult television show Mystery Science Theater 3000. He was played by Josh "J. Elvis" Weinstein.

Role
Dr. Erhardt is a mad scientist and was Dr. Clayton Forrester's first assistant. He is a very different character from Forrester's later assistant, TV's Frank. He is more high-spirited than Frank, speaks with a high, squeaky voice, has curly black hair, and thick glasses. Erhardt is himself a "mad scientist" like Forrester, whereas Frank is neither a scientist nor, for the most part, mad. Just like Frank, however, Erhardt goes through many tortures by Dr. Forrester. His catchphrase was, after soberly describing a horrible movie's plot or some other dire scenario, to proclaim cheerily, "Enjoy!"

Little is known of Erhardt's past save that he became a "mad scientist" while working at a zoo; he went mad when, in his own words: "...they promised me students, but all I got were monkeys! Monkeys! Monkeys! So I took off my wetsuit, dropped that hedge clipper, and walked out of that zoo forever!" Any additional details are left for the viewers to fill in themselves since MST3K was, after all, "just a show", and the viewers should "really just relax".

Eventually finding employment at Gizmonic Institute, he became Dr. Forrester's assistant and worked with him to launch Joel Robinson into space, where the pair conducted their movie-watching experiments on him.

Dr. Erhardt was only on the show for the KTMA season and the nationally telecast Season 1. When Frank was first introduced on the show and Joel asked what happened to Dr. Erhardt, Frank simply held up a milk carton with Erhardt's picture on it saying, "He's missing". Because Best Brains, the production company behind MST3K, discouraged the replaying of Season 1 episodes and had no rights to the KTMA episodes, few fans had actually had a chance to see him and therefore Erhardt fell into obscurity.  After the milk carton reference, he was mentioned only once more, in episode #313 - Earth vs. the Spider featuring a scene where a policeman closely resembling Erhardt is eaten by a giant spider, and Joel and the bots speculated that this was the true fate of Erhardt.

Dr. Erhardt returned in episode #1204 - The Day Time Ended, and is now depicted as a suave space hero changed by thirty years of interstellar travel. He returns to retrieve the ashes of Dr. Forrester (and, incidentally, TV's Frank) from the Gizmonic Institute.

Behind the scenes
Dr. Forrester and Dr. Erhardt were first shown in episode K07, during the show's original season on KTMA TV23. During this season, and season 1, J. Elvis Weinstein (who was credited under his real name Josh Weinstein) held a dual role as both Dr. Erhardt and the voice of Tom Servo, and he also provided the voice of Gypsy during the KTMA years (replaced in season one by Jim Mallon). Weinstein, the youngest of the MST3K creators, left the show after its first nationally telecast season due to creative differences once the show began being scripted instead of being ad-libbed. His youth and relative inexperience was also said to have rubbed his older co-workers the wrong way. In an interview, he stated the show simply quit being fun for him when they moved from KTMA to The Comedy Channel because it became "a business". Weinstein elaborated on this unpleasant workplace dynamic in an April 2019 episode of Bill Corbett’s Funhouse podcast, wherein he claimed that producer Jim Mallon was openly hostile toward him and insisted on his being paid significantly less than other cast members, presumably because of his age and refusal to maintain a level of “faux humility” displayed by some of his cohorts.

External links

Mystery Science Theater 3000 characters
Fictional mad scientists
Male characters in television
Fictional scientists in television
Television characters introduced in 1988